L.J. Jenkins (born July 17, 1987) is an American former professional rodeo cowboy who specialized in bull riding. He competed in the Professional Bull Riders (PBR) and the Professional Rodeo Cowboys Association (PRCA) circuits.

Jenkins is one of only three bull riders in history (the other two being Ty Murray and Ted Nuce) to win both the PBR World Finals and the National Finals Rodeo (NFR).

Background
L.J. Jenkins was born on July 17, 1987, in Springfield, Missouri. He is 5 feet, 10 inches tall, and weighed 170 pounds while competing.

During his early career, Jenkins lived in Texico, New Mexico, where he attended Texico High School.

Career
Jenkins qualified for the PBR World Finals 11 consecutive times (2005 to 2015). Jenkins won the PBR World Finals event in 2006. He competed briefly in the Championship Bull Riding (CBR) tour from 2004 to 2005 and qualified for the CBR World Finals in 2004. He also competed briefly on the PRCA circuit from 2009 to 2012 and qualified for the PRCA's NFR in 2011 where he won the average title in the bull riding.

Jenkins competed the first few years of his professional career with a cowboy hat. However, by the middle of the  2009 season, he was riding with a helmet.

After fracturing his C1 vertebra at the 2015 Built Ford Tough Series event in Nampa, Idaho, Jenkins made the decision to retire from bull riding in the summer of 2015, thus missing his 11th consecutive trip to the PBR World Finals (which he had qualified for). His total PBR career earnings amounted to over $1.8 million. In 2016, the Missouri Sports Hall of Fame inducted Jenkins. Since retiring, Jenkins has become a bucking bull stock contractor, providing his own bulls for various events (including PBR events).

In December 2017, Jenkins came out of retirement for one final bull ride in the form of an exhibition at an event in Claremore, Oklahoma, where he successfully rode his bull for eight seconds. He rode with a cowboy hat. He now runs his own semi-professional organization: the L.J. Jenkins Bull Riding Tour.

Personal life
Jenkins resides outside Porum, Oklahoma, on a 600 acre cattle ranch.

References

Sources

External links
 Official Facebook
 Official Twitter

Living people
1987 births
Bull riders
People from Muskogee County, Oklahoma
People from Curry County, New Mexico
People from Springfield, Missouri